The Art of Three is a 2001 live album by the jazz trio of Billy Cobham, Ron Carter and Kenny Barron containing excerpts from two concerts of their 2001 European tour.

Track listing 
 "Stella By Starlight" (Ned Washington, Victor Young) – 10:43 
 "Autumn Leaves" (Joseph Kosma, Johnny Mercer, Jacques Prévert) – 10:00 
 "New Waltz" (Ron Carter) – 6:55 
 "Bouncing With Bud" (Bud Powell) – 7:02 
  "'Round Midnight" (Bernie Hanighen, Thelonious Monk, Cootie Williams) – 7:56 
 "And Then Again" (Kenny Barron) – 11:25 
 "I Thought About You" (Mercer, Jimmy Van Heusen) – 10:26 
 "Someday My Prince Will Come" (Larry Morey, Frank Churchill) – 9:19

Personnel
 Billy Cobham – Drums
 Ron Carter – Bass
 Kenny Barron – Piano

Credits 
 Blaise Grandjean – Engineer

References

External links
 

2001 live albums
Split albums
Billy Cobham albums
Ron Carter albums
Kenny Barron albums